Karl Borschke (11 June 1886 – 14 July 1941) was an Austrian painter. His work was part of the painting event in the art competition at the 1936 Summer Olympics.

References

1886 births
1941 deaths
20th-century Austrian painters
20th-century Austrian male artists
Austrian male painters
Olympic competitors in art competitions
Artists from Vienna